Michail Stifunin (: Mikhail Yuryevich Stifunin; born 4 August 1978) is a former ice dancer who competed internationally for Russia and France. Competing for Russia with Nina Ulanova, he is the 1997 World Junior champion and the 1998 Nebelhorn Trophy champion. He later competed with Magali Sauri for France.

Career 
Early in his career, Stifunin competed with Nina Ulanova, coached by Andrei Filippov. The duo placed fifth at the 1996 World Junior Championships in Brisbane, Australia. In the 1996–97 season, they won gold at the 1997 World Junior Championships in Seoul, South Korea. After the event, Filippov moved to Australia and Ulanova/Stifunin joined Alla Belyaeva. They skated together until 1999, placing as high as fifth at the senior Russian Championships. 

In 1999, Stifunin moved to France and teamed up with Magali Sauri. Representing France, they skated together for three seasons and won the silver medal at the 2000 Nebelhorn Trophy. Sauri/Stifunin were coached by Lydie Bontemps in Lyon.

Around 2012, he began working with the Russian national team.

Programs 
(with Sauri)

Results 
GP: Grand Prix

With Sauri for France

With Ulanova for Russia

References 

Russian male ice dancers
French male ice dancers
Living people
1978 births
Figure skaters from Moscow
World Junior Figure Skating Championships medalists
Universiade medalists in figure skating
Universiade silver medalists for Russia
Competitors at the 1997 Winter Universiade
Competitors at the 1999 Winter Universiade